Dionysius (Dionysios) was a tyrant of Heraclea Pontica on the Euxine (the Black Sea). He was a son of Clearchus, who had assumed the tyranny in his place of birth. 

When Clearchus died (353/352 BC), he was first succeeded by his brother Satyrus, who reigned as guardian for Clearchus' sons, Timotheus and Dionysius. Satyrus was succeeded by Timotheus, who soon shared power with his younger brother Dionysius. After the death of Timotheus, Dionysius became the sole ruler of Heraclea (in 337/336 BC). 

After the destruction of the Persian empire by Alexander the Great, Dionysius attempted to extend his dominions in Anatolia. In the meantime, some of the citizens of Heraclea, who had been driven into exile by their tyrants, asked Alexander to restore republican government in Heraclea, but Dionysius, with the assistance of Alexander's sister, Cleopatra of Macedon, acted to prevent any steps being taken to that effect. But, despite these efforts, Dionysius still did not appear to have felt very safe in his position, as evidenced by the delight with which he received the news of Alexander's death.  He was so pleased with this development that he erected a statue of euthymia, that is, of joy or peace of mind. 

Following Alexander's death, the exiled Heracleans then asked Perdiccas for his assistance.  In response, Dionysius endeavoured to secure his position by joining Perdiccas' enemies. Dionysius also married Amastris, the former wife of Craterus. This marriage led to considerable political advantages for Dionysius. He then formed a friendship with Antigonus by assisting him in his war against Asander.  Ptolemy, the nephew of Antigonus, married Dionysius' daughter by his first wife. 

Thanks to these actions and alliances, Dionysius was able to remain in undisturbed possession of the tyranny of Heraclea for many years. In 306 BC, when the surviving generals of Alexander assumed the titles of king (basileus), Dionysius followed their example, but he died soon after. The death of Dionysius must have taken place in 306 or 305 BC, as, according to Diodorus, he died at the age of 55, and after a reign of 32 or 33 years. 

According to Athenaeus, Dionysius was said to have been the mildest and most just of all the tyrants that had ever lived.  He was succeeded by his wife, Amastris, who reigned during the minority of her sons, Clearchus II and Oxyathres. 

Coins of Dionysius have been found, some of which were issued during his joint reign with his older brother Timotheus and others during his sole rule.

Notes

References
Smith, William (editor); Dictionary of Greek and Roman Biography and Mythology, "Dionysius", Boston, (1867)

Ancient Greek tyrants
People from Heraclea Pontica
Hellenistic Bithynia
4th-century BC Greek people